Carlos Ruiz Apezteguía (born July 7, 1930 in Concepción, Paraguay, died on May 15, 1995, in Asuncion, Paraguay, was a Paraguayan journalist and entrepreneur.

Life
Born in the city of Concepción, Paraguay, his parents were Mr. Pedro Ruiz Gomez, Spanish son and director of the Spanish company Segura Latorre in Paraguay, and Mrs. Julia Apezteguía Casañas, daughter of Basque Spaniards. He was married to Myriam Schaerer Ayala, eldest daughter of Arturo Schaerer and granddaughter of Eduardo Schaerer, the President of Paraguay between 1912 and 1916.

Journalism and legacy
His studies were conducted at the German School in Asuncion and San Jose High School. He later studied at the University of the Republic in Montevideo, Uruguay, and then law at the National University of Asuncion. From a young age he joined the Liberal Party and became one of its leading exponents. Between 1952 and 1954 he was President of the Liberal Alon Party, the youth wing of the Liberal Party, as well as the University Federation of the Liberal Party, and along with Justo Prieto, Evelio Fernández Arévalos and other exponents of liberalism faced the dark years after the Paraguayan Civil War.

He was manager of the newspaper La Tribuna since 1954, and from there also he fought, with its director Arturo Schaerer, denouncing abuses and crimes of the dictatorship and the breakdown of rule of law that began with Higinio Morínigo and continued with Alfredo Stroessner. He was persecuted, imprisoned and tortured many times, but never gave in to his ideals of freedom and better future for their homeland. In November 1956 the newspaper La Tribuna was intervened brutally, with Ruiz A. arrested, tortured and then abandoned in a boat on the shores of Clorinda, Argentina, thereby initiating exile to Montevideo, Uruguay, accompanied by his wife and small daughter Maria Angelica.

In 1959, through mediation of his wife's grandfather, Araminto Ayala, Consul of Uruguay in Paraguay, returns to Paraguay and resumes his journalistic work in the newspaper La Tribuna. Later he founded with Arturo Schaerer the printing industry EMASA (Maria Angelica Company SA), which became the main printing industry of the country during the 60s, also the newspaper La Tribuna grew and consolidated as one of the most respected newspapers at continental level, for his incorruptible line against the dictatorship, with agencies in many countries, pass from 2,000 copies daily in times of its founding to more than 70,000 by the year 1965, being that value until today greater than the current daily circulation of Paraguay.

On May 15, 1972, Arturo Schaerer was succeeded by Carlos Ruiz Apezteguia in the direction of the newspaper. During his direction, he denounced abuses in the negotiations of the Treaty of Itaipu and Yacyreta, with Brazil and Argentina respectively on the construction of the hydroelectric dams. Achieving under the pressure exerted by him, no modification of the voltage and frequency of the Paraguayan electric system, what had been intended for the benefit of the Brazilian system and intended to use almost all of Paraguay's energy. He always protested for the dark and unfavorable conditions accepted in these Treaties. He continued frontal and acid criticism to the dictatorial government, embodied in a memorable manifesto he wrote called "Put the Moral into fashion". It was reported Stroessner used to say of him: "Carlos Ruiz Apezteguía kicks ahead and not back."

He died on May 15, 1995 in Asuncion.

Others
Ruiz Apezteguia appears as a character in the television film One Man's War (1991), with Anthony Hopkins, as the director of the newspaper that Joel Filártiga (Hopkins) comes to denounce the death of his son in hands of the dictatorship.

References

 Traces of Schaerer family. Review of Swiss Immigration to Paraguay and Rio de la Plata. Juan Emilio Escobar Schaerer y Celia Escobar Schaerer. 2007
 La Tribuna Archives.
 Prensa Latinoamericana / Paraguay www.red-redial.net/prensa-pais-paraguay.html

External links
Prensa latinoamericana | Paraguay

Paraguayan journalists
Male journalists
People from Concepción Department, Paraguay
1930 births
1995 deaths
Paraguayan people of Basque descent
20th-century journalists